Qarah Gol (also known as Qarah Gūl) is a village in Varqeh Rural District, in the Central District of Charuymaq County, East Azerbaijan Province, Iran. At the 2006 census, its population was 53, in 11 families.

References 

Populated places in Charuymaq County